Get Out of My Yard is the eighth solo and first entirely instrumental studio album by American guitarist Paul Gilbert.

Track listing
All songs written by Paul Gilbert, except where noted.

Personnel
 Paul Gilbert – electric & acoustic guitars, bass, vocals
 Mike Szuter – bass on tracks 8, 10, and 11
 Jeff Bowders – drums
 Emi Gilbert – piano on track 6, Hammond organ on track 8, classical consultation on track 12

References

Paul Gilbert albums
Instrumental albums
2006 albums
Shrapnel Records albums